Congreve is a lunar impact crater that is located on the far side of the Moon relative to the Earth, and lies across the lunar equator. It lies to the west-northwest of the massive walled plain Korolev. To the southeast is the crater Icarus, and due north is Zhukovskiy.

The rim of this crater is worn by impact erosion, particularly along the eastern side where a pair of small crater lie along the edge. The rim and inner wall are more prominent to the west and north, while it forms only a shallow ridge to the southeast. The interior floor is marked by a cluster of small craters in the northeastern part, and tiny craterlets scattered across the remainder.

Satellite craters
By convention these features are identified on lunar maps by placing the letter on the side of the crater midpoint that is closest to Congreve.

References

 
 
 
 
 
 
 
 
 
 
 
 

Impact craters on the Moon